Samuel Gibson Stewart (November 29, 1895 – August 29, 1950) was an American boxer who competed in the 1920 Summer Olympics. He was born in Kansas and died in San Francisco, California. In 1920 he was eliminated in the quarter-finals of the heavyweight class after losing his fight to the eventual gold medalist Ronald Rawson.

References

External links
Profile on Sports Reference

1895 births
1950 deaths
Boxers from Kansas
Heavyweight boxers
Olympic boxers of the United States
Boxers at the 1920 Summer Olympics
American male boxers